Mir Muhammad Akbar Mengal is a Pakistani politician and the member-elect of the Provincial Assembly of Balochistan.

Political career
Mengal was elected to the Provincial Assembly of Balochistan from the constituency PB-40 in 2018 Pakistani by-elections on the ticket of Balochistan National Party (Mengal). He defeated an independent candidate Shafiqur Rehman Mengal. He garnered 23,742 votes while his closest rival secured 14,512 votes.

References

Living people
Balochistan National Party (Mengal) politicians
Politicians from Balochistan, Pakistan
Year of birth missing (living people)